The Dog Who Wouldn't Be Quiet is an Argentine absurdist drama film directed by Ana Katz and written by Gonzalo Delgado with Katz. The film stars Daniel Katz, Julieta Zylberberg, Valeria Lois, Mirella Pascual and Carlos Portaluppi.

The film had its world premiere at the 2021 Sundance Film Festival on January 30, 2021.

Premise
Sebas, an illustrator approaching middle age, experiences a number of bittersweet life changes inspired by absurd events, including a silent dog inexplicably judged by neighbors and co-workers to be deafening, and the arrival of a meteor that permanently poisons all of Earth's atmosphere above four feet off the ground.

Cast
The cast include:
 Daniel Katz as Seba
 Julieta Zylberberg
 Valeria Lois
 Mirella Pascual
 Carlos Portaluppi

Release
The film had its premiere in the 2021 Sundance Film Festival on January 30, 2021 in the World Cinema Dramatic Competition section.

Reception
The review aggregator website Rotten Tomatoes surveyed  and, categorizing the reviews as positive or negative, assessed 29 as positive and 0 as negative for a 100% rating. Among the reviews, it determined an average rating of 7.3 out of 10.

It won the VPRO Big Screen Award at the 50th International Film Festival Rotterdam, and the Havana Star Prize for Best Screenplay at the 21st Havana Film Festival New York.

References

External links
 
 

2021 films
Argentine drama films
Argentine independent films
2021 drama films
2021 independent films
2020s Argentine films